He Kills Coppers is a three-part television drama, broadcast on ITV between 23 March and 6 April 2008. The drama stars Mel Raido, Liam Garrigan and Rafe Spall, and involves the death of three police officers during the celebrations of the 1966 World Cup. The story explores the three men most connected with the deaths. The drama is based on the best-selling novel by Jake Arnott. The series was subsequently released on DVD on 7 April 2008.

Cast
 Mel Raido as Billy Porter
 Liam Garrigan as Jonathan Young
 Rafe Spall as Frank Taylor
 Steven Robertson as Tony Meehan
 Tim Woodward as Nipper Reid
 Kelly Reilly as Jeannie
 Paul Ritter as Sid Franks
 John Joseph as Jimmy
 Cavan Clerkin as Stan
 Lucy Holt as Sandra
 James Dreyfus as Julian
 Frank Harper as DI Ernie Franklin
 Maureen Lipman as Lily Porter
 Ben Cartwright as DC Mickey Parks
 Simon Snashall as DS Reg Wilson
 Arthur Darvill as PC Wallis

Episodes

References

External links
 

2008 British television series debuts
2008 British television series endings
2000s British television miniseries
ITV television dramas
English-language television shows
Television series by All3Media
Television series set in the 1960s
Television series set in the 1970s
Television series set in the 1980s
2000s British crime drama television series